Government of Washington may refer to:

 Government of Washington (state)
 Government of Washington, D.C.
 Federal government of the United States in Washington, D.C.
 Presidency of George Washington, 1789–1797